= Afriwood Comics =

Nigerian comic book publisher

- Parent company: Afriwood Motion pictures
- Status: Active
- Founded: 2020; 6 years ago
- Founder: Urenna Amadi
- Country of origin: Nigeria
- Headquarters location: Owerri, Imo State
- Fiction genres: Superhero; Action; Adventure

Afriwood Comics is a Nigerian based comic book publishing company, a property of Afriwood Motion pictures, an African based film production company founded in 2015. They are the creators of the first Nigerian live-action superhero "Shutter-Bird" and publishers of comic books "Urenna Amadi: The extraordinary Shutter Bird" and "Urenna Amadi: The incredible Shutter Bird".

== Company ==
Afriwood Comics, a subsidiary of Afriwood Motion Pictures Company is an African-based comic book publisher. They are aimed at promoting African heroes and stories in comic books through the art of storytelling.

== History ==
Afriwood comics was founded in 2020 by Film director Urenna Amadi. They launched their first comic Character “Shutter-Bird” which is the first Nigerian live-action superhero in Owerri, Imo State on November 27, 2020.

In November 2022 they released the first chapter of their first comic book titled “Urenna Amadi: The extraordinary Shutter Bird” and it is the First Nigerian Superhero Comics series. The book features African comic super hero Shutter-Bird, it tells a story of Urenna Amadi, a young superhero who uses her powers to protect and uplift her community. This series is an addition to African comics, emphasizing the strength, courage, and resilience, it is available both digitally and in print.

In 2024, five chapters of "Urenna Amadi: The Incredible Shutter-Bird" was released as the first Nigerian Superhero graphic novel.

== Comic books ==
Series	Year	Main character	Editor	Chapters
Urenna Amadi: The extraordinary Shutter Bird	2022	Shutter-Bird	Urenna Amadi	1
Urenna Amadi: The incredible Shutter Bird	2024	Shutter-Bird	Urenna Amadi	5
